Honeydon is a hamlet located in the Borough of Bedford in Bedfordshire, England.

Honeydon lies in the civil parish of Staploe (where the 2011 Census population was included), and is close to Upper Staploe and Begwary. The settlement is also close to the border of Huntingdonshire.

Famous residents
 Joseph Fielding, early leader of the Latter Day Saint movement, born in Honeydon in 1797

References

Hamlets in Bedfordshire
Borough of Bedford